Lower West Side may refer to the following neighborhoods:
Lower West Side, Chicago
Lower West Side, Buffalo New York
Lower West Side, Manhattan

See also
Lower East Side
Upper West Side